{{DISPLAYTITLE:C14H14O4}}
The molecular formula C14H14O4 (molar mass: 246.262 g/mol) may refer to:

 Marmesin
 Tenual